Mark Giacheri (born 1 February 1969 in Sydney) is a former Italian-Australian rugby union player and a current coach. He played as a lock.

He first played for New South Wales Waratahs, from 1988/89 to 1996/97. He moved to Benetton Treviso in 1995/96, playing there for two seasons and being National Champion in 1996/97. Then, he would play two seasons at West Hartpool, in England, from 1997/98 to 1998/99, one season at CA Brive, in 1999/2000. Moving once more to England, he played for Sale Sharks (2000/01-2001/02), Rotherham Titans (2002/03) and Coventry R.F.C. (2003/04-2004/05), where he also played Rugby League with the Coventry Bears, and where he would finish his player career.

He first played for Australia U-21, but having dual citizenship, Australian and Italian, he would be called by coach Bertrand Fourcade for Italy, in 1992, while still playing in his home country. He had his first game at 1 October 1992, at the 22-3 win over Romania, in Rome, for the FIRA Championship, D1, Pool B. He had 48 caps for Italy, from 1992 to 2003. He was called for the 1995 Rugby World Cup, playing two games, and for the 1999 Rugby World Cup, playing three games. Giacheri played twice at the Six Nations Championship, in 2002 and 2003. His last game was at the 61-6 loss to Ireland, at 30 August 2003, in Limerick, in a friendly, aged 34 years old.

Giacheri returned to Australia, after finishing his player career, becoming a coach. He is the head coach of Randwick DRUFC, since 2010/11 and finished coaching the side in 2013.

In 2013 was in Turin for the world master games with Australian team Mosman Whales Rugby Union Over 45  and won the gold medal.

In 2014, Giacheri became the head coach of American side San Francisco Golden Gate RFC, a team that pronominally competes in the Pacific Rugby Premiership.

References

External links

1969 births
Living people
Australian rugby union players
Australian rugby union coaches
Australian people of Italian descent
Italian rugby union players
Italian rugby union coaches
Italy international rugby union players
Benetton Rugby players
CA Brive players
Sale Sharks players
Rugby union flankers